The Battle of Valea Albă, also known as the Battle of Războieni or the Battle of Akdere, was an important event in the medieval history of Moldavia. It took place at Războieni, also known as Valea Albă, on July 26, 1476, between the Moldavian army of Stephen the Great and an invading Ottoman army which was commanded personally by Sultan Mehmed the Conqueror.

Background
In 1475 the Ottoman's attempt to bring Moldavia under their control, at winter by using an army of Rumelian local levies, ended disastrously with a defeat in the Battle of Vaslui. During the proper military campaign season, the Ottomans assembled a large army under the command of Sultan Mehmed II and entered Moldavia in June 1476. Meanwhile, groups of Tartars from the Crimean Khanate (the Ottomans' recent ally) were sent to attack Moldavia. Romanian sources may state that they were repelled. Other sources state that joint Ottoman and Crimean Tatar forces "occupied Bessarabia and took Akkerman, gaining control of the southern mouth of the Danube. Stephan tried to avoid open battle with the Ottomans by following a scorched-earth policy." In the process the Moldavians forces ended up being dispersed throughout the country, leaving only a small force of about 12,000–20,000 men, led by Stephen himself, to face the main Ottoman attack.

The battle
The battle began with the Moldavians luring the main Ottoman forces into a forest that was set on fire, causing some casualties to the attacking Ottoman army in the forest. According to another battle description, the defending Moldavian forces repelled several attacks with steady fire from hand-guns. The attacking Ottoman Janissaries were forced to crouch on their stomachs instead of charging headlong into the defenders' positions. Seeing the imminent defeat of his forces, Mehmed charged with his personal guard against the Moldavians, managing to rally the Janissaries, and turning the tide of the battle. Ottoman Janissaries penetrated inside the forest and engaged the defenders in man-to-man fighting.

The Moldavian army was utterly defeated (casualties were very high on both sides, and the chronicles say that the entire battlefield was covered with the bones of the dead, a probable source for the toponym (Valea Albă is Romanian and Akdere Turkish for "The White Valley").

Aftermath
Stephen retreated into the north-western part of Moldavia or even into the Polish Kingdom and began forming another army.
The Ottomans captured considerable parts of Moldavian territory but were unable to conquer some of the major Moldavian strongholds such as Suceava, Neamț, and Hotin and were constantly harassed by small-scale Moldavians attacks. Soon they were also confronted with starvation, a situation made worse by an outbreak of the plague.

Meanwhile, anti-Ottoman forces were being assembled in Transylvania under Stephen V Báthory's command. Confronted with this army and with Stephen's counterattack, the Ottomans retreated from major parts of Moldavia in August 1476 to come back again in 1480.

In fiction
In the Romanian theatrical play Apus de Soare by Barbu Ștefănescu Delavrancea (set in the final year of Stephen's reign), one can find a description of the battle in the form of a dialog between the daughters and widows of the boyars who had fallen in the battle, in which they describe how their respective fathers and husbands had to drag Stephen out of the battle, as he desperately tried to keep fighting.

References

Bibliography

1476 in Europe
Battles involving Moldavia
Battles involving Wallachia
Battles involving the Ottoman Empire
Military history of Romania
History of Western Moldavia
Conflicts in 1476
Battles of Mehmed the Conqueror
Stephen the Great
1476 in the Ottoman Empire